The checkerboard worm lizard (Trogonophis wiegmanni) is a species of amphisbaenian in the family Trogonophidae. The species is monotypic within the genus Trogonophis, and is endemic to North Africa. Its natural habitats are temperate forests, Mediterranean-type shrubby vegetation, temperate grassland, sandy shores, arable land, and pastureland. It is threatened by habitat loss.

Subspecies
There are two subspecies, which can be distinguished by their coloration. The nominotypical subspecies, Trogonophis w. wiegmanni , has a pale yellow ground color, while T. w. elegans  has a gray-white or light pink ground color.

Description
Both subspecies of T. wiegmanni exhibit the following characteristics. The head is rounded and slightly compressed dorso-ventrally. The snout is slightly protruding. Two pairs of cephalic shields are present. The nostrils open forward. External ears are absent. The skull is elongate compared to other Trogonophidae.

The body is wormlike: legless, elongate, cylindrical, and annulated. There are sunken lateral lines. The short conical tail lacks autotomy. The body is short and stout relative to other legless lizards. Both sexes lack pre-anal pores.

Habitat
T. wiegmanni can found in areas with abundant leaf litter, sandy soil and moist soil that is covered with stones and other ground cover. It can also be found near roadsides, in traditionally cultivated areas, in oak forest and oak-juniper forests, in sandy patches with no vegetation and in steppe habitat.

T. wiegmanni has a tolerance for a broad range of habitats such as; temperate forest, shrubland, temperate grassland, artificial/terrestrial arable Land, and artificial/terrestrial pastureland.

Etymology
The specific name, wiegmanni, is in honor of German herpetologist Arend Friedrich August Wiegmann.

Common names
Trogonophis wiegmanni is commonly known in English as "Wiegmann's worm lizard" or the "checkerboard worm lizard", in French as "Trogonophis ", and in German as "Schachbrett-Doppelschleiche " or "Wiegmanns Spitzschwanz Doppelschleiche ".

Geographic range
T. wiegmanni is native to northern Algeria, western Morocco, the Chafarinas Islands of Spain, and northwestern Tunisia.

Behavior
T. wiegmanni can be found mostly under rocks/stones in its specific habitats, sometimes in pairs. Individuals of the same sex in this species are never found together under the same rock indicating intrasexual intolerance. Females benefit from male presence through enhanced vigilance or reduced harassment by other males within this species.

Diet
Trogonophis wiegmanni consumes a variety of insects and other soil invertebrates.

Reproduction
T. wiegmanni is viviparous.

References

Further reading

Boulenger, George A. (1885). Catalogue of the Lizards in the British Museum (Natural History). Second Edition. Volume II ... Amphisbænidæ. London: Trustees of the British Museum (Natural History). (Taylor and Francis, printers). xiii + 497 pp. + Plates I-XXIV. (Trogonophis wiegmanni, p. 470). 
Boulenger, George A. (1891). "Catalogue of the reptiles and batrachians of Barbary (Morocco, Algeria, Tunisia), based chiefly upon the notes and collections made in 1880-1884 by M. Fernand Lataste". Tr. Zool. Soc. 13: 93-164.
Duméril, A. M. C., and G. Bibron (1839). Erpétologie Générale ou Histoire Naturelle Complète des Reptiles. Tome cinquième [Volume 5]. Paris: Roret/Fain et Thunot. viii + 854 pp. (in French).

Gervais, Paul (1835). "Les principaux résultats de l'étude . . . de reptiles envoyés de Barbarie ". Bulletin de la Société des Sciences Naturelle de France (dernier trimestre), Séance de 23 Dec. 1835, 1: 112-114. (Amphisbaena elegans, new species, p. 113). (in French).
Kaup J (1830). "Trogonophis, Eine neue Amphibiengattung, den Amphisbaenen zunächst verwandt ". Isis von Oken 23: 880-881. (Trogonophis, new genus, p. 880; Trogonophis wiegmanni, new species, p. 881). (in German).

Trogonophidae
Reptiles described in 1830
Taxa named by Johann Jakob Kaup

Taxonomy articles created by Polbot